Varzaqan (electoral district) is the 13th electoral district in the East Azerbaijan Province of Iran. This electoral district has a population of 45,708 and elects 1 member of parliament.

1980
MP in 1980 from the electorate of Varzaqan. (1st)
 Shahab-adin Bimegdar

1984
MP in 1984 from the electorate of Varzaqan. (2nd)
 Shahab-adin Bimegdar

1988
MP in 1988 from the electorate of Varzaqan. (3rd)
 Fereydun Ghasemi

1992
MP in 1992 from the electorate of Varzaqan. (4th)
 Golmohammad Eliasi

1996
MP in 1996 from the electorate of Varzaqan. (5th)
 Ali Akbarzadeh

2000
MP in 2000 from the electorate of Varzaqan. (6th)
 Ali Akbarzadeh

2004
MP in 2004 from the electorate of Varzaqan. (7th)
 Golmohammad Eliasi

2008
MP in 2008 from the electorate of Varzaqan. (8th)
 Reza Alizadeh

2012
MP in 2012 from the electorate of Varzaqan. (9th)
 Allahverdi Dehghani

2016

Notes

References

Electoral districts of East Azerbaijan
Varzaqan County
Deputies of Varzaqan